Daniel Batz (born 12 January 1991) is a German professional footballer who plays as a goalkeeper for 1. FC Saarbrücken.

Career
In January 2016, Batz was released from his contract at Chemnitzer FC and joined SV Elversberg.

On 3 March 2020, Batz helped his side to a victory over Bundesliga side Fortuna Düsseldorf by saving five penalties to make his team the first ever fourth-tier side to get into the DFB-Pokal semi-finals.

References

External links
 

1991 births
Living people
German footballers
Association football goalkeepers
SC Freiburg players
SpVgg Greuther Fürth players
1. FC Nürnberg players
Chemnitzer FC players
SV Elversberg players
1. FC Saarbrücken players
Bundesliga players
3. Liga players
Regionalliga players
Sportspeople from Erlangen
Footballers from Bavaria